Runelight is a 2011 children's fantasy novel by Joanne Harris and is the second in her RUNE series, following her previous novel, Runemarks. The book centers on Maddy Smith, and her twin sister, Maggie Rede, both on opposing sides of a war between the new gods and the old, who must both face powerful forces in order to save everything they hold dear. Harris began working on the sequel due to feeling "that it wasn't finished as a story, that there was one chapter in the story that might continue".

Description 
Three years after the events in Runemarks, the Middle World has changed again. After the destruction of the Order, the surviving gods, having rescued their friends from the Black Fortress of Netherworld, have regrouped in the village of Malbry. The General is dead and chances of rebuilding Asgard seem remote. But a prophecy, coupled with the appearance of unnatural creatures in the Middle Worlds, reveal a breach in Chaos, which may lead to another Apocalypse. Once more, Maddy and her friends are forced to confront an enemy. This time, the enemy is one of their own, a renegade from World's End - Maddy's twin sister. They are both the daughters of Thor.

Reception
Critical reception for the book has been mixed, with the Express panning Runelight while a reviewer for the Guardian praised it. Monsters and Critics wrote that while the book was "not an easy read ... it is worth persevering".

References

External links 
Joanne Harris' website
Runemarks website

2011 British novels
2011 children's books
Children's fantasy novels
British children's novels
British fantasy novels
Norse mythology in popular culture
Norse mythology in art and literature
Novels by Joanne Harris
Doubleday (publisher) books